Titans of Tech, also known as TechTV's Titans of Tech, was a 60-minute documentary type American television program on TechTV that profiled the tech industry's leaders. The show was produced and aired in 2001. Some of the people profiled on the show include Michael Dell, Steve Ballmer and John Gage.

References

External links
TechTV | What is 'TechTV's Titans of Tech'? via the Internet Archive

Documentary television series about technology
TechTV original programming